Jessie Crosland (17 November 187916 June 1973) was a scholar of medieval French literature, Lecturer in French at Westfield College.

Life
Jessie Raven was the youngest daughter of the Plymouth Brethren preacher Frederick Edward Raven (18371903). She married Joseph Beardsall Crosland, a civil servant whom she met through the Brethren, in 1904. In 1921, she accompanied her husband to the Cairo Conference on the Middle East, later relating her recollections of Winston Churchill's behaviour at the conference:
 She retired in 194647. Her son was the politician Anthony Crosland (29 August 191819 February 1977). She died on 16 June 1973, in Merton, London.

Works
 (tr.) The song of Roland. London: Chatto & Windus, 1907. With an introduction by Louis Brandin.
 (ed.) Guibert d'Andrenas, chanson de geste. Manchester: University Press, 1923.
 (tr.) Raoul de Cambrai, an old French feudal epic. London: Chatto & Windus, 1926.
 The Old French epic. Oxford: Blackwell, 1951.
 Medieval French literature. Oxford: Blackwell, 1956.
 Outlaws in fact and fiction. London: P. Owen, 1959.
 William the Marshal: the last great feudal baron. London: P. Owen, 1962.
 (tr.) 'On the performance of Beethoven's symphonies' by Felix Weingartner. In Weingartner on music & conducting: three essays. New York: Dover Publications, 1969.
 Sir John Fastolfe: a medieval 'Man of property'. London: Owen, 1970.

References

External links
 Journal publications by Jessie Crosland, MHRA

1879 births
1973 deaths
Academics of Westfield College
French–English translators
Scholars of French literature